Selagia argyrella is a species of snout moth. It is found in almost all of Europe, except Ireland, Norway, Finland, Estonia, Ukraine and Portugal. In the east, the range extends to Asia.

The wingspan is 22–28 mm. The forewings are lustrous pale buff with whitish suffusion. Adults are on wing from June to September.

The larvae feed on Calluna vulgaris, Helianthemum and Potentilla. They feed between spun leaves of their host plant. The species overwinters in a cocoon on the host plant.

References

Moths described in 1775
Phycitini
Moths of Japan
Moths of Europe